Gustave Caillebotte (19 August 1848 – 21 February 1894) was a French painter who was a member and patron of the Impressionists, although he painted in a more realistic manner than many others in the group. Caillebotte was known for his early interest in photography as an art form.

Early life

Gustave Caillebotte was born on 19 August 1848 to an upper-class Parisian family living in the rue du Faubourg-Saint-Denis. His father, Martial Caillebotte (1799–1874), was the inheritor of the family's military textile business and was also a judge at the Tribunal de commerce de la Seine. Caillebotte's father was twice widowed before marrying Caillebotte's mother, Céleste Daufresne (1819–1878), who had two more sons after Gustave: René (1851–1876) and Martial (1853–1910). Caillebotte was born at home on rue du Faubourg-Saint-Denis in Paris and lived there until 1866, when his father had a home built on 77 rue de Miromesnil. It probably was around this time that Caillebotte began to draw and paint.

Caillebotte earned a law degree in 1868 and a license to practice law in 1870, and he also was an engineer. Shortly after his education, he was drafted to fight in the Franco-Prussian war, and served from July 1870 to March 1871 in the Garde Nationale Mobile de la Seine.

Artistic life

Development
After the war, Caillebotte began visiting the studio of painter Léon Bonnat, where he began to study painting seriously. He developed an accomplished style in a relatively short time and had his first studio in his parents' home. In 1873, Caillebotte entered the École des Beaux-Arts, but apparently did not spend much time there. He inherited his father's fortune in 1874 and the surviving sons divided the family fortune after their mother's death in 1878. Gustave and his brother sold the Yerres estate and moved into an apartment on the Boulevard Haussmann in Paris.

Around 1874, Caillebotte had met and befriended several artists working outside the Académie des Beaux-Arts, including Edgar Degas and Giuseppe de Nittis, and attended (but did not participate in) the first Impressionist exhibition of 1874. The "Impressionists" – also called the "Independents", "Intransigents", and "Intentionalists" – had broken away from the academic painters showing in the annual Salons.

Caillebotte made his debut in the second Impressionist exhibition in 1876, showing eight paintings, including Les raboteurs de parquet (The Floor Scrapers) (1875), his earliest masterpiece. Its subject matter, the depiction of labourers preparing a wooden floor (thought to have been that of the artist's own studio) was considered "vulgar" by some critics and this is the probable reason for its rejection by the Salon of 1875. At the time, the art establishment deemed only rustic peasants or farmers acceptable subjects from the working class. The painting is now at the Musée d'Orsay in Paris. A second version, in a more realistic style resembling that of Degas, also was exhibited, demonstrating Caillebotte's range of technique and his adept restatement of the same subject matter.

Style

In common with his precursors Jean-François Millet and Gustave Courbet, as well his contemporary Degas, Caillebotte aimed to paint reality as it existed and as he saw it, hoping to reduce the inherent theatricality of painting. Perhaps because of his close relationship with so many of his peers, his style and technique vary considerably among his works, as if "borrowing" and experimenting, but not really sticking to any one style. At times, he seems very much in the Degas camp of rich-colored realism (especially his interior scenes); at other times, he shares the Impressionist commitment to "optical truth" and employs an impressionistic pastel-softness and loose brush strokes most similar to Renoir and Pissarro, although with a less vibrant palette.

The tilted ground common to these paintings is characteristic of Caillebotte's work, which may have been strongly influenced by Japanese prints and the new technology of photography, although evidence of his use of photography is lacking. Cropping and "zooming-in", techniques that commonly are found in Caillebotte's oeuvre, may also be the result of his interest in photography, but may just as likely be derived from his intense interest in perspective effects. A large number of Caillebotte's works also employ a very high vantage point, including View of Rooftops (Snow) (Vue de toits (Effet de neige)) (1878), Boulevard Seen from Above (Boulevard vu d'en haut) (1880), and A Traffic Island (Un refuge, boulevard Haussmann) (1880).

Themes

Caillebotte painted many domestic and familial scenes, interiors, and portraits. Many of his paintings depict members of his family; Young Man at His Window (Jeune Homme à la fenêtre) (1876) shows René in the home on rue de Miromesnil; The Orange Trees (Les Orangers) (1878), depicts Martial Jr. and his cousin Zoé in the garden of the family property at Yerres; and Portraits in the Country (Portraits à la campagne) (1875) includes Caillebotte's mother along with his aunt, cousin, and a family friend. There are scenes of dining, card playing, piano playing, reading, and sewing, all executed in an intimate, unobtrusive manner that portrays the quiet ritual of upper-class indoor life.

His country scenes at Yerres focus on pleasure boating on the leisurely stream as well as fishing and swimming, and domestic scenes around his country home. He often used a soft impressionistic technique reminiscent of Renoir to convey the tranquil nature of the countryside, in sharp contrast to the flatter, smoother strokes of his urban paintings. In Oarsman in a Top Hat (1877), he effectively manages the perspective of a passenger in the back of a rowboat facing his rowing companion and the stream ahead, in a manner much more realistic and involving than Manet's Boating (1874).

Caillebotte is best known for his paintings of urban Paris, such as The Europe Bridge (Le Pont de l'Europe) (1876), and Paris Street; Rainy Day (Rue de Paris; temps de pluie, also known as La Place de l'Europe, temps de pluie) (1877). The latter is almost unique among his works for its particularly flat colors and photo-realistic effect, which give the painting its distinctive and modern look, almost akin to American Realists such as Edward Hopper. Many of his urban paintings were quite controversial due to their exaggerated, plunging perspective. In Man on a Balcony (1880), he invites the viewer to share the balcony with his subject and join in observing the scene of the city reaching into the distance, again by using unusual perspective. Showing little allegiance to any one style, many of Caillebotte's other urban paintings produced in the same period, such as The Place Saint-Augustin (1877), are considerably more impressionistic.

Caillebotte's still life paintings focus primarily on food, some at table ready to be eaten and some ready to be purchased, as in a series of paintings he made of meat at a butcher shop. He also produced some floral still-life paintings, particularly in the 1890s. Rounding out his subject matter, he painted a few nudes, including Homme au bain (1884) and Nude on a Couch (1882), which, although provocative in its realism, is ambivalent in its mood—neither overtly erotic nor suggestive of mythology—themes common to many nude paintings of women during that era.

Later life

In 1881, Caillebotte acquired a property at Petit-Gennevilliers, on the banks of the Seine near Argenteuil, and he moved there permanently in 1888. He ceased showing his work at age 34 and devoted himself to gardening and to building and racing yachts, and he spent much time with his brother, Martial, and his friend Auguste Renoir. Renoir often came to stay at Petit-Gennevilliers, and engaged in far-ranging discussions on art, politics, literature, and philosophy. Caillebotte was a model for Renoir's 1881 painting, Luncheon of the Boating Party. Although he never married, Caillebotte appears to have had a serious relationship with Charlotte Berthier, a woman eleven years his junior and of the lower class, to whom he left a sizeable annuity.

Caillebotte's painting career slowed dramatically in the early 1890s when he stopped working on large canvases. Caillebotte died of pulmonary congestion while working in his garden at Petit-Gennevilliers in 1894 at age 45. He was interred at Père Lachaise Cemetery in Paris.

For many years, and partly because he never had to sell his work to support himself, Caillebotte's reputation as a painter was overshadowed by his recognition as a supporter of the arts. Seventy years after his death, however, art historians began reevaluating his artistic contributions. His striking use of varying perspective sets him apart from his peers who may have otherwise surpassed him. His art was largely forgotten until the 1950s when his descendants began to sell the family collection. In 1964, The Art Institute of Chicago acquired Paris Street; Rainy Day, spurring American interest in him. By the 1970s, his works were being exhibited again and critically reassessed.

The National Gallery of Art (Washington, D.C.) and the Kimbell Art Museum (Fort Worth, Texas) organized a major retrospective display of Caillebotte's painting for exhibition in 2015–2016.

Patron and collector

Caillebotte's sizable allowance, along with the inheritance he received after the death of his father in 1874 and his mother in 1878, allowed him to paint without the pressure to sell his work. It also allowed him to help fund Impressionist exhibitions and support his fellow artists and friends (Claude Monet, Auguste Renoir, and Camille Pissarro among others) by purchasing their works and, at least in the case of Monet, paying the rent for their studios.

Caillebotte bought his first Monet in 1875 and was especially helpful to that artist's career and financial survival. He was precise in his sponsorship; notably absent are works by Georges Seurat and Paul Gauguin, or any of the Symbolists. In 1890, he played a major role in assisting Claude Monet in organizing a public subscription and in persuading the French state to purchase Édouard Manet's 1863 Olympia.<ref>PBS.org CultureShock, Manet's Olympia]</ref>

Other interests
In addition, Caillebotte used his wealth to fund hobbies for which he was quite passionate, including stamp collecting, orchid growing, yacht building, and even textile design (the women in his paintings Madame Boissière Knitting, 1877, and Portrait of Madame Caillebotte, 1877, may be working on patterns created by Caillebotte). After his death, he was inscribed in the Roll of Distinguished Philatelists, and the collection he formed with his brother Martial is now in the British Library.

Caillebotte's collection

Convinced after the death in 1876 of his younger brother René that his own life would be short, Caillebotte wrote his will while still in his twenties. In the will, Caillebotte bequeathed a large collection to the French government. This collection ultimately included sixty-eight paintings by Camille Pissarro (nineteen), Claude Monet (fourteen), Pierre-Auguste Renoir (ten), Alfred Sisley (nine), Edgar Degas (seven), Paul Cézanne (five), and Édouard Manet (four).

At the time of Caillebotte's death, the Impressionists were still largely condemned by the art establishment in France, which remained dominated by Academic art and specifically, the Académie des Beaux-Arts. Because of this, Caillebotte realised that the cultural treasures in his collection would likely disappear into "attics" and "provincial museums". He therefore stipulated that they must be displayed in the Luxembourg Palace (devoted to the work of living artists), and then in the Louvre. The French government would not agree to these terms. In February 1896, they finally negotiated terms with Renoir, who was the executor of the will, under which they took thirty-eight of the paintings to the Luxembourg Palace. The installation constituted the first presentation of the Impressionists in a public venue in France. The remaining twenty-nine paintings (one by Degas was taken by Renoir in payment for his services as executor) were offered to the French government twice again, in 1904 and 1908, and were both times refused. When the government finally attempted to claim them in 1928, the bequest was repudiated by the widow of Caillebotte's brother Martial Caillebotte. One of the remaining works, Bathers at Rest, was purchased by Albert C. Barnes and is now held by the Barnes Foundation. Forty of Caillebotte's own works are held by the Musée d'Orsay. His Man on a Balcony, Boulevard Haussmann (Homme au balcon, boulevard Haussmann) (1880), sold for more than US$14.3 million in 2000.

Gallery

References and sources
References

Sources
Berhaut, Marie (1994). Gustave Caillebotte: Catalogue raisonné des peintures et pastels. Paris: Wildenstein Institute.
Broude, Norma (Ed.) (2002). Gustave Caillebotte and the Fashioning of Identity in Impressionist Paris. New Brunswick, New Jersey: Rutgers University Press.
Distel, Anne (1996). Gustave Caillebotte: The Unknown Impressionist. London: The Royal Academy of Arts, London.
Distel, Anne; Druick, Douglas W.; Groom, Gloria & Rapetti, Rodolphe (1995). Gustave Caillebotte, Urban Impressionist. New York: Abbeville Publishing Group (Abbeville Press, Inc.) & The Art Institute of Chicago. (American catalogue for retrospective exhibition in Paris, Chicago, & Los Angeles, 1994–1995.)
Charles, Daniel; Fonsmark, Anne-Birgitte; Hansen, Dorothee; Hedin, Gry & Thomson, Richard (2008). "Gustave Caillebotte". Published by Hatje Cantz. (Exhibition catalogue for exhibition at Ordrupgaard, Copenhagen & Kunsthalle Bremen, 2008–2009)
Morton, Mary & Shackelford, George T.M. (2015). "Gustave Caillebotte: The Painter's Eye".  Chicago: University of Chicago Press (Catalogue for retrospective exhibition in Washington, DC, and Fort Worth, Texas 2015–2016.)
Varnedoe, Kirk (1987). [https://books.google.com/books?id=Mb6iLfHghO0C Gustave Caillebotte. New Haven: Yale University Press. 
Wittmer, Pierre (1991). Caillebotte and His Garden at Yerres''. New York: Harry N. Abrams, Inc.

External links

 Caillebotte at MuseumSyndicate 
 Caillebotte at WebMuseum
 Caillebotte at The Artchive
 Cailebotte at CGFA
 Cailebotte at Musée d'Orsay
 200 works by Gustave Caillebotte
 The Caillebotte Brothers, Painter and Photographer
Kirk Varnedoe, Gustave Caillebotte
 Caillebotte's Man at his Bath
 Caillebotte works at the Art Institute of Chicago

1848 births
1894 deaths
19th-century French painters
19th-century French male artists
French male painters
Painters from Paris
Burials at Père Lachaise Cemetery
Deaths from pulmonary edema
Fathers of philately
French engineers
French Impressionist painters
19th-century French lawyers
French military personnel of the Franco-Prussian War